Strong Creek Park is a municipal park located on the Peace River mouth of Strong Creek, 8 km south of the Town of Peace River, Alberta on Shaftesbury Trail (Highway 684).

Activities

The park features a contoured large day use area, playground, fire pits, 18 free camping sites (no power hookups or showers), outhouses and drinking water. Strong Creek Park has a boat launch on to the Peace River and a small sandy beach. It is the launch-site of the annual Paddle the Peace event organized by surrounding municipalities on Father's Day.

References

Parks in Alberta